El Rosario is a district of the Naranjo canton, in the Alajuela province of Costa Rica.

History 
El Rosario was created on 14 January 1967 by Ley 4020. Segregated from San Miguel.

Geography 
El Rosario has an area of  km² and an elevation of  metres.

Demographics 

For the 2011 census, El Rosario had a population of  inhabitants.

Transportation

Road transportation 
The district is covered by the following road routes:
 National Route 1
 National Route 715

References 

Districts of Alajuela Province
Populated places in Alajuela Province